The Joy may refer to:

 The Joy (album), a 2015 album by The Neverclaim
 "The Joy" (song), a song by  Jay-Z and Kanye West from the 2011 album Watch the Throne
 Mountjoy Prison, a prison in Ireland nicknamed The Joy
 Alias of Metal Gear character The Boss

See also